Marquess of San Felices de Aragón is a hereditary title in the Peerage of Spain, granted in 1634 by Philip III to Francisca de Gurrea, in memory of her widow, Miguel de Moncayo y Celdrán.

Marquesses of San Felices de Aragón (1634)

Francisca de Gurrea y Ximénez-Cerdán, 1st Marchioness of San Felices de Aragón
Juan de Moncayo y Gurrea, 2nd Marquess of San Felices de Aragón
José Lorenzo de Aragón y Gurrea, 3rd Marquess of San Felices de Aragón
José Claudio de Aragón y Castro Pinós, 4th Marquess of San Felices de Aragón
?
?
?
?
Luis Rebolledo de Palafox y Melci, 9th Marquess of San Felices de Aragón
María de la Blanca Mencos y Rebolledo de Palafox, 10th Marchioness of San Felices de Aragón
Alonso Cristiano Álvarez de Toledo y Mencos, 11th Marquess of San Felices de Aragón
María de los Reyes Álvarez de Toledo y Mencos, 12th Marchioness of San Felices de Aragón

See also
Spanish nobility

References

Marquesses of Spain
Lists of Spanish nobility